Beth Ann Arnoult-Ritthaler (born December 1, 1965) is a retired American wheelchair tennis player who competed in international level events. She was a silver medalist at the 2007 Parapan American Games. She was a quarterfinalist in the women's singles in the 2008 Summer Paralympics and was fourth place in the women's doubles with Kaitlyn Verfuerth.

Arnoult was paralysed from a car accident with an all-terrain vehicle in 1991 when her vertebrae were shattered leaving her paralysed.

References

External links
 
 

1965 births
Living people
People with paraplegia
Tennis people from Hawaii
Paralympic wheelchair tennis players of the United States
Wheelchair tennis players at the 2008 Summer Paralympics
People from Paia, Hawaii